Ivamere Rokowati (born 15 April 2001) is a Fijian rugby sevens player. She was named in the Fijiana sevens team for the 2022 Commonwealth Games in Birmingham. She won a silver medal.

References 

2001 births
Living people
Female rugby sevens players
Fijian female rugby union players
Fiji international women's rugby sevens players
Commonwealth Games silver medallists for Fiji
Commonwealth Games medallists in rugby sevens
Rugby sevens players at the 2022 Commonwealth Games
Medallists at the 2022 Commonwealth Games